The 2012 Puerto Rican general elections were held on Tuesday, November 6, 2012 to elect the officials of the Puerto Rican government that would serve for the next four years, most notably the Governor of Puerto Rico. A status referendum was held on the same date.

The election was won by then-Senator Alejandro García Padilla (from the Popular Democratic Party), who defeated incumbent Governor Luis Fortuño (from the New Progressive Party) in a close election. This election marked the second time in more than 40 years that six parties participated in the election, the first time in more than 60 years that a status referendum was held on the same day as the general election, and the first time in Puerto Rico that absentee ballots were issued for those who were out of the country on the day of the election. , this was the most recent time a member of the Popular Democratic Party won the governorship of Puerto Rico, and the last time a Republican did so.

Nominations

Before the election year, the Constitution of Puerto Rico provides for any qualified person to present their candidacy for a specific position. If two or more candidates from the same party present their candidacy for the same position, and they can't reach an agreement within the party, a primary election is held. This election is held within the inscribed members of each party, to select which of the candidates will represent the party in the general election.

Both of the main parties: New Progressive Party (PNP) and Popular Democratic Party (PPD), held primaries for several positions on March 18, 2012.

New Progressive Party (PNP)

The primaries were held on March 18, 2012 to determine several candidates for the Senate, House of Representatives, and others.

Popular Democratic Party (PPD)

The primaries were held on March 18, 2012 to determine several candidates for the Senate, House of Representatives, and others.

Final candidates

Governor

The incumbent Governor, Luis Fortuño, from the New Progressive Party (PNP), faces the following candidates for the Governorship:
 Alejandro García Padilla, Popular Democratic Party (PPD)
 Juan Dalmau Ramírez, Puerto Rican Independence Party (PIP)
 Rogelio Figueroa, Puerto Ricans for Puerto Rico Party (PPR)
 Arturo Hernández, Movimiento Union Soberanista (MUS)
 Rafael Bernabe Riefkohl, Working People's Party of Puerto Rico (PPT)

Resident Commissioner

The incumbent Resident Commissioner of Puerto Rico Pedro Pierluisi, from the New Progressive Party (PNP), faces the following candidates for the position:
 Rafael Cox Alomar, Popular Democratic Party (PPD)
 Juan Mercado Nieves, Puerto Rican Independence Party (PIP)
 Sadiasept Guillont Juarbe, Puerto Ricans for Puerto Rico Party (PPR)
 María de Lourdes Guzmán, Movimiento Union Soberanista (MUS)
 Félix Córdova Iturregui, Working People's Party of Puerto Rico (PPT)

Senate of Puerto Rico

At-large

The ballot featured seventeen (17) candidates from six different parties and one independent candidate (bold denotes incumbent candidates)

New Progressive Party (PNP)
 Lucy Arce
 Margarita Nolasco
 Itzamar Peña
 Thomas Rivera Schatz
 Melinda Romero
 Larry Seilhamer

Popular Democratic Party (PPD)
 Eduardo Bhatia
 Antonio Fas Alzamora
 Rossana López León
 Angel Rosa
 Cirilo Tirado Rivera
 Aníbal José Torres

Other parties
 María de Lourdes Santiago (PIP)
 Carmen M. Sánchez Betancourt (PPR)
 José "Che" Paraliticci (MUS)
 Ineabelle Colón (PPT)
 Herminio Pagán Calderín (Independent)

District

San Juan
 Angel "Luigi" Alicea (PIP)
 Isabel Borras Marín (MUS)
 José "Pepe" Córdova (PPT)
 Liza Fernández (PNP)
 Héctor González Pereira (PIP)
 Fred Guillont Juarbe (PPR)
 Zoé Laboy (PNP)
 José Nadal Power (PPD)
 Ramón Luis Nieves (PPD)

Bayamón
 Ruth E. Arroyo Muñoz (PPT)
 Víctor Caraballo (PIP)
 Miguel Reyes Dávila (PPD)
 José Orlando Muñoz (PPD)
 Migdalia Padilla (PNP)
 Carmelo Ríos Santiago (PNP)
 José A. Ojeda Santos (PIP)
 Carlos Alberto Velázquez (MUS)

Arecibo
 Wanda Arroyo (PPD)
 Jaime Bonel González (PIP)
 Rafael Capella Angueira (MUS)
 Luis Cruz (PIP)
 Angel "Chayanne" Martínez (PNP)
 José "Joito" Pérez (PNP)
 Rubén Soto (PPD)

Mayagüez-Aguadilla
 María Teresa González (PPD)
 Alberto O. Lozada Colón (MUS)
 Edwin Morales Pérez (PPT)
 Luis Daniel Muñíz (PNP)
 Gilberto Rodríguez (PPD)
 Orlando Ruiz Pesante (PIP)
 Samuel Soto Bosques (PIP)
 Evelyn Vázquez (PNP)

Ponce
 Luis Berdiel (PNP)
 Javier Maldonado Mercado (PIP)
 Luis Enrique Martínez (PIP)
 Ramón Ruiz (PPD)
 Martín Vargas Morales (PPD)
 Eliezer Velázquez (PNP)

Guayama
 Roberto Colón Ocasio (MUS)
 José Enrique Laboy Gómez (PIP)
 Benjamín "Bengie" León (Independent)
 Miguel Pereira (PPD)
 Edny Ramírez Pagán (PIP)
 Angel Rodríguez Otero (PPD)
 Miguel Rodríguez (PNP)
 Carlos Javier Torres (PNP)

Humacao
 Maritza Algarín Sepúlveda (PIP)
 Vilma Calderón Jiménez (MUS)
 José Luis Dalmau (PPD)
 José Ramón Díaz (PNP)
 José Luis "Tito" Dones (PPR)
 Juan "Cholo" Lebrón (PIP)
 Carlos Mercado Cotto (PPT)
 Luz M. Santiago González (PNP)
 Jorge Suárez Cáceres (PPD)

Carolina
 Pedro José "Pepe" Alvarez (PIP)
 Fabiola Carrasquillo (PPR)
 Edwin M. González (PPR)
 Roger Iglesias (PNP)
 Luis Daniel Rivera (PPD)
 Dwight E. Rodríguez Orta (PIP)
 Pedro A. Rodríguez (PPD)
 Guillermo Sosa Rodríguez (MUS)
 Lornna Soto (PNP)

House of Representatives

At-large

The ballot featured sixteen (16) candidates from six different parties and one independent candidate (bold denotes incumbent candidates)

New Progressive Party (PNP)
José Aponte
Jennifer González
José E. Meléndez Ortíz
María Milagros Charbonier
Lourdes Ramos
José "Pichy" Torres Zamora

Popular Democratic Party (PPD)
 Jaime Perelló
 Luis Vega Ramos
 Charlie Hernández
 Jorge Colberg Toro
 Eduardo Ferrer Ríos
 Brenda López de Arrarás

Other parties
 Dennis Márquez (PIP)
 Edwin Meléndez Delgado (PPR)
 José "Tato" Rivera Santana (MUS)
 Eva L. Ayala (PPT)
 Alexander Febus Medina (Independent)

Election results

Governor

The candidate from the Popular Democratic Party (PPD) Alejandro García Padilla narrowly beat the incumbent Luis Fortuño, from the New Progressive Party (PNP). The margin of victory was 0.7% (or 11,049 votes) which would make it the second closest election in the island in the last 20 years. The candidates of the minority parties all received less than the required 3% to remain registered. Notably, Rogelio Figueroa (from the PPR) received only 6,508 (0.35%) after receiving 53,693 (2.76%) in the 2008 general elections.

Resident Commissioner

The incumbent Pedro Pierluisi, from the New Progressive Party (PNP) defeated the candidate from the Popular Democratic Party (PPD), Rafael Cox Alomar. Pierluisi managed to be reelected, despite the fact that his ballot partner, Governor Fortuño, lost against the PPD candidate. This would be the second time in the last 10 years were the Governor and the Resident Commissioner come from different parties. The first one was after the 2004 elections where PPD candidate Aníbal Acevedo Vilá narrowly won the election, while Fortuño (PNP) was elected Resident Commissioner.

Senate of Puerto Rico

The Popular Democratic Party (PPD) won a majority of seats in the Senate of Puerto Rico, with a total of 18 out of 27. The New Progressive Party (PNP) won a total of 8 seats, while the Puerto Rican Independence Party (PIP) won one seat. The PPD won the majority after two terms of being a minority. The election of a senator from the PIP also comes after one term with no senator seated. The PPD won six of the Puerto Rico Senatorial districts. The PNP won only two districts, despite winning all eight during the previous election.

Puerto Rico House of Representatives

The Popular Democratic Party (PPD) also won a majority of seats in the Puerto Rico House of Representatives, with a total of 28 out of 51. The New Progressive Party (PNP) won a total of 23 seats. The other minority parties won no seats. Like with the Senate, the PPD won the majority after two terms of being a minority.

Mayoral

The Popular Democratic Party (PPD) won a majority of the mayoralty races in the island, with a total of 46 out of 78 municipalities. The New Progressive Party (PNP) won a total of 31. One of the most notable races featured PPD candidate Carmen Yulín Cruz defeating incumbent Jorge Santini (PNP) for the mayoralty of the capital city of San Juan after 12 years in the seat.

References

 
Puerto Rico